Tudorel Cristea (born 22 April 1964) is a Romanian former footballer who played as a midfielder and defender. After he retired from his playing career he worked for a while as a manager.

International career
Tudorel Cristea played nine friendly games at international level for Romania. He made his debut when he came as a substitute and replaced Nelu Stănescu at half time in a 1–1 against Iraq.

Honours
Mecanică Fină București
Divizia C: 1983–84
Dinamo București
Divizia A: 1991–92

References

External links

1964 births
Living people
Romanian footballers
Romania international footballers
Association football midfielders
Liga I players
Liga II players
FC Brașov (1936) players
FC Sportul Studențesc București players
FC Dinamo București players
FC Progresul București players
Romanian expatriate footballers
Expatriate footballers in Belgium
Romanian expatriate sportspeople in Belgium
Romanian football managers